"Beautiful Dangerous" is the third track and third single on the debut self-titled solo album by current Guns N' Roses and former Velvet Revolver guitarist, Slash. It features Fergie of The Black Eyed Peas on vocals. Though not initially released as an official single, the song managed to peak at number 11 on the Heatseekers Songs chart and number 58 on the Canadian Hot 100.

Composition
During an interview, where Slash goes through each of his album tracks, he stated:

Slash told The Sun: "The track began as a piece of music I'd written as a score for a strip bar scene and it made me think of [Fergie]. I'm a guy and there's nothing sexier than seeing a cute girl sing rock 'n' roll."

Music video
On August 27, 2010, it was announced that Slash was filming a music video for the song. Slash stated that "[the] concept is twisted; Fergie's idea." 
The video for "Beautiful Dangerous" premiered on Vevo on October 26, 2010.
The video depicts Fergie as a deranged woman who is obsessed with Slash. The room she is staying in is strewn with posters, tickets and other memorabilia of Slash. A tube television plays Slash concerts on repeat, and Fergie is seen engaged in some kind of strange fetishist worship of the television. Later on she is seen dressing provocatively and going to a concert where Slash is playing and presumably follows him to a strip club afterwards. Fergie makes visual advances to Slash to which he responds and they both start flirting. After secretly drugging his drink, they leave the bar and head to a hotel. Slash, having been drugged, is held captive by Fergie and tied to a bed. Fergie mounts, kisses, and intimidates him with a knife. In the end, she stabs Slash, killing him.

Charts

Personnel
 Slash - lead & rhythm guitars
 Fergie - lead vocals
 Chris Chaney - bass
 Josh Freese - drums
 Lenny Castro - percussion
 Big Chris Flores - keyboards, programming

References 

Songs written by Slash (musician)
Songs written by Fergie (singer)
Fergie (singer) songs
2009 songs
2010 singles
Slash (musician) songs
Song recordings produced by Eric Valentine
EMI Records singles
Roadrunner Records singles
Music videos directed by Rich Lee